Cyligramma griseata is a moth of the family Noctuidae. It is found in Africa, including Nigeria and Uganda.

Catocalinae